Limoux is a commune and subprefecture in the Aude department, a part of the ancient Languedoc province and the present-day Occitanie region in southern France. Its vineyards are famous for being first to produce sparkling wine known as Blanquette de Limoux.

Geography
Limoux lies on the river Aude about  due south of Carcassonne. It has two railway stations on the line to Carcassonne: Limoux station and Limoux-Flassian station.

Population

Blanquette de Limoux

Blanquette de Limoux is produced around the city of Limoux. The main grape of the wine is Mauzac, followed by Chardonnay and Chenin blanc. Wine historians believe that the world's first sparkling wine was produced in this region in 1531, by the monks at the abbey in Saint-Hilaire, Aude.

Culture

The town is perhaps best known for its Winter festival called Fecos , often referred to (inaccurately) as a Carnival or Fête. It is generally referred to as Carnival de Limoux in French language. It is known for its British expatriate population.

During the French Revolution, demonstrators forced officials to seal the granaries, demanded an end to dues and indirect taxes and then ransacked the tax-collector's offices and threw records into the River Aude.

Images

Sights
The heart of the town is the place de la République, a wide square with some fine stone arcading and a number of timber-framed houses. Limoux straddles the River Aude and the banks are lined with grand houses, especially on the eastern side, the so-called Petite Ville (lit. "Small City").

While worth visiting in itself, the town is also a good  base for discovering the history of the region and is ideally placed for exploring the coast, the mountains and some good walking country.

Markets
 Weekly market every Friday (or Thursday if a public holiday falls on a Friday).
 Flea market or Brocante the first Sunday of each month on the Promenade du Tivoli.
 Evening markets on Tuesdays in July and August.

Other sights
 The Musée Petiet (Tourist Information Office),
 Musée du Piano (Museum of the piano)
 CathaRama (a history of the Cathar movement).
 Winery tours at Sieur d'Arques and Aimery.
 Jardin aux Plantes la Bouichère - Flassian, 2 hectares of gardens which is home to various collections of increasingly rare plant varieties.

Personalities
Limoux was the birthplace of:
 Francis de Gaston, Chevalier de Levis (1719–1787), Marshal of France
 Alexandre Guiraud (1788–1847), poet, dramatic author and novelist
 Poulpard (1981-20**), one of the most famous French stand-up comedians, also writer of several dramatic novels.

See also
 Corbières Massif
 Limoux Grizzlies, a rugby league club from Limoux
 Limoux wine, white wine, usually sparkling, produced in the area
Communes of the Aude department

References

External links

 Photos of Limoux
 Aude in photos: Limoux (163 photos)
 Site de la Bande de Carnaval de Limoux ’Les Limouxins’ 

Communes of Aude
Subprefectures in France
Languedoc
Aude communes articles needing translation from French Wikipedia